Saverio Urvin Adenie (born 11 May 1996) is a Surinamese footballer who currently plays for KESK Leopoldsburg in Belgium and the Suriname national football team. He has so far capped 5 games with Suriname.

References

External links
Caribbean Football Database profile
 
 

1996 births
Living people
S.V. Robinhood players
Surinamese footballers
Suriname international footballers
Association football defenders
Surinamese expatriate footballers
Expatriate footballers in Belgium
Surinamese expatriate sportspeople in Belgium